Stephenville Air Station (ADC ID: N-23) is a closed General Surveillance Radar station. It was closed in 1971.

History
The site was established in 1951 as a General Surveillance Radar station, built by the United States Air Force as part of the Pinetree Line of Ground-Control Intercept (GCI) radar sites.

USAF units and assignments
Units:
 640th Aircraft Control and Warning Squadron

Assignments:
64th Air Division (NEAC), 1 September 1951
4731st Air Defense Group (ADC), 1 November 1957
Goose Air Defense Sector, 6 June 1960
37th Air Division, 1 April 1966
21st Air Division, 31 March 1970 – 30 June 1971

See also
 List of USAF Aerospace Defense Command General Surveillance Radar Stations

References

  A Handbook of Aerospace Defense Organization 1946 - 1980,  by Lloyd H. Cornett and Mildred W. Johnson, Office of History, Aerospace Defense Center, Peterson Air Force Base, Colorado
 Winkler, David F. (1997), Searching the skies: the legacy of the United States Cold War defense radar program. Prepared for United States Air Force Headquarters Air Combat Command.

Installations of the United States Air Force in Canada
Radar stations of the United States Air Force
Military installations in Newfoundland and Labrador
1951 establishments in Newfoundland and Labrador
1971 disestablishments in Newfoundland and Labrador
Military installations closed in 1971
Military installations established in 1951